Villa Altagracia is a municipality (municipio) of the San Cristóbal province in the Dominican Republic. Within the municipality there are three municipal districts (distritos municipal): La Cuchilla, Medina and San José del Puerto.

Climate
Under the Köppen climate classification system, Villa Altagracia has a trade-wind tropical rainforest climate (Köppen Af). There is a definite wetter period from May to October, but even the driest months of January and February see at least  of rainfall.

The climate is hot, oppressive and partly cloudy.

Clouds 
With temperature that remains consistent year round, the variant between seasons is the cloud coverage. The clearer part of the year spans from November to May followed by the cloudier season starting and May and into November.

Rain 
A wet day in Villa Altagracia requires 0.04 inches of liquid in precipitation. The wetter season lasts from late April to November, with 15% or more chance of being a wet day.

Humidity 
The muggier season lasts for nearly 10 months, from mid March to Mid January. The comfort level is muggy at least 79% of the time.

Wind 
The windier season takes place from early November into Mid May.

References 

 News about Villa Altagracia Dominican Republic
 https://weatherspark.com/y/26718/Average-Weather-in-Villa-Altagracia-Dominican-Republic-Year-Round

Populated places in San Cristóbal Province
Municipalities of the Dominican Republic